Ab Kaseh or Ab Kasseh may refer to:
 Ab Kaseh, Khuzestan
 Ab Kaseh, Kohgiluyeh and Boyer-Ahmad
 Ab Kaseh, Boyer-Ahmad, Kohgiluyeh and Boyer-Ahmad Province
 Ab Kaseh, Lorestan